Gloppen Friidrettslag (also GFIL, eng: Gloppen athletics club) is a sports club in Gloppen, Norway, founded in 1990.

The club is a superstructure club for the five existing track and field athletics in the municipality (Brodd, Breimsbygda, Fjellhug/Vereide, Hyen, Sandane). Byrkjelo stadion is the club's home track, where the Norwegian Championships were last held in 2011.

GFIL is among the leading track and field clubs in Norway. Well known athletes are the throwers and national champions Kjell Ove Hauge (shot put and discus), Arne Indrebø (javelin), Elin Isane (discus and shot put) and Trude Raad (hammer throw). Odd Bjørn Hjelmeset also has a medal from the National championships in 3000 meter steeplechase for the club.

External links
Official site

Sports clubs established in 1990
Sport in Sogn og Fjordane
Gloppen
Athletics clubs in Norway
1990 establishments in Norway